Walter Johannes Mixa (born 25 April 1941) is a German prelate of the Catholic Church who is the Bishop Emeritus of Augsburg and Ordinary Emeritus of the Bundeswehr. He resigned as Bishop of Augsburg in 2010 due to allegations of fraud and violence towards children who had been in his care, as well as the sexual abuse of priests.

Biography 
Mixa was born in Königshütte, Silesia (today Chorzów, Poland). His family fled to Western Germany at the end of World War II. Mixa passed his Abitur in 1964 and studied Catholic theology in Dillingen and Fribourg. He was ordained in 1970 in Augsburg and thereafter he studied for his doctorate at the University of Augsburg. From 1973 to 1996 he also worked as a religion teacher in Schrobenhausen. In 1975 Mixa became a parish priest in Schrobenhausen and bishop of Eichstätt in 1996. In August 2000 Mixa was appointed Catholic Military Bishop of the Bundeswehr by Pope John Paul II. In July 2005 Mixa became Bishop of Augsburg. On 21 March 2012 he was appointed a Member of the Pontifical Council for the Pastoral Care of Health Care Workers by Pope Benedict XVI.

Beliefs
Mixa is described as being conservative and close to Pope Benedict.
According to The Times newspaper, Mixa is outspoken and "has railed against the German Government for making "birth machines" out of women" and has "compared abortion to the Holocaust". He has also condemned Israel's treatment of Palestinians in the Occupied Territories and has said of the 2010 child abuse scandal that "The sexual revolution of the 1960s is at least partly to blame for this".

Abuse allegations
In March 2010 he was accused of physical abuse by five ex-pupils of a children's care home, where Mixa served as a visiting priest in the 1970s and 1980s. He has denied the allegations. Further accusers have come forward and the bishop says that he cannot remember any of them. In April 2010 Mixa stated that he cannot exclude having slapped children 20–30 years ago saying he was "sorry for causing many people grief", though, according to BBC, he didn't explain what exactly he meant.

On 21 April 2010 he offered his resignation to Pope Benedict XVI, who accepted it on 8 May. Benedict met with Mixa on 1 July and confirmed his acceptance of Mixa's resignation. The Holy See Press Office reported that Mixa "confirmed having committed errors and mistakes, which caused a loss of confidence and made the resignation inevitable".

Muslim immigration
In January 2019, he attended an event sponsored by city councilman Eberhard Brett, a member of Germany's far-right AfD party, to discuss the role of Muslims in German society. He supported the construction of mosques that are "compatible" (verträglich) and not "stately buildings" (Herrschaftsbauten), and said the real concern was Islamic groups that take an offensive stance and with preaching against German values. He said Muslims believe they can kill those who do not submit to them, and needed to acknowledge Germany's basic law establishing the equality of persons and respect for others.

References

1941 births
Living people
Roman Catholic bishops of Augsburg
People from Chorzów
People from the Province of Silesia
University of Fribourg alumni
University of Augsburg alumni
Members of the European Academy of Sciences and Arts